The 2017–18 West of Scotland Super League was the 16th and final season of the West Super League, the top tier of league competition for SJFA West Region member clubs.

The league comprised two divisions, a West of Scotland Super League Premier Division of 12 clubs and a West of Scotland Super League First Division of 14 clubs. The competition began on Saturday 19 August 2017.

This was the final season using the format ahead of league reconstruction for the 2018–19 season. The West of Scotland Super League Premier Division was renamed the West of Scotland Premiership and expanded to 16 teams. The West of Scotland Super League First Division was renamed the West of Scotland Championship and also expanded to 16 teams.

The winners of the Super League Premier Division entered the preliminary round of the 2018–19 Scottish Cup.

Super League Premier Division

Format changes
There were no automatic relegation from the Premier Division to the new Championship, however the bottom two entered the West Region Play-offs for a place in the new Premiership.

Member clubs for the 2017–18 season
Glenafton Athletic were the reigning champions.

Clydebank and Girvan were promoted from the Super League First Division, replacing the automatically relegated Troon and Largs Thistle.

Kilwinning Rangers claimed the final spot after defeating Kilsyth Rangers 3–2 on aggregate in the West Region League play-off.

1 Groundsharing with Cumbernauld United.

Managerial changes

League table

Results

Super League First Division

Format changes
The top four were promoted to the new Premiership with fifth and sixth entering the West Region Play-offs. There was no automatic relegation from the First Division to the new League One, however, the bottom two entered the West Region Play-offs for a place in the new Championship.

Member clubs for the 2017–18 season

Troon and Largs Thistle were relegated from the Super League Premier Division.

Darvel and Kello Rovers were promoted from the Ayrshire District League while Cambuslang Rangers and Larkhall Thistle gained promotion from the Central District First Division.

They were joined by Kilsyth Rangers who lost the West Region League play-off 3–2 on aggregate to Kilwinning Rangers.

Irvine Victoria were relegated to the Ayrshire District League and Blantyre Victoria, Shotts Bon Accord and Yoker Athletic were relegated to the Central District First Division.

Managerial changes

League table

Results

West Region League play-offs

Premiership
As the teams finishing 11th and 12th in the Super League Premier Division, Girvan and Arthurie entered a play-off against the teams finishing fifth and sixth (Troon and Irvine Meadow) in the Super League First Division for the final two places in the new West Region Premiership.

First leg

Second leg

Irvine Meadow won 4–1 on aggregate.

Troon won 4–2 on aggregate.

Championship
Maryhill and Shettleston finished as the bottom two of the Super League First Division, they entered a play-off against the teams finishing fourth in the Ayrshire District League (Whitletts Victoria) and the Central District First Division (Neilston) for the final two places in the new West Region Championship.

First leg

Second leg

Whitletts Victoria won 4–1 on aggregate.

Neilston won 2–1 on aggregate.

References

6
SJFA West Region Premiership seasons